Petalura is a genus of very large dragonflies in the family Petaluridae.
Species of Petalura are brown or black with yellow markings and usually clear wings. The anal appendages of the males are broad and leaf-like giving them their common name of petaltails.
They are endemic to south-western and eastern Australia.

Species
The genus includes the following species:
Petalura gigantea  - South-eastern petaltail
Petalura hesperia  - Western petaltail
Petalura ingentissima  - Giant petaltail
Petalura litorea  - Coastal petaltail
Petalura pulcherrima  - Beautiful petaltail

References

Petaluridae
Anisoptera genera
Odonata of Australia
Endemic fauna of Australia
Taxa named by William Elford Leach
Taxonomy articles created by Polbot